Black Joe Lewis (born Tucson, Arizona, United States) is an American blues, funk and soul artist influenced by Howlin' Wolf and James Brown.  He formed Black Joe Lewis & The Honeybears in Austin, Texas, in 2007.  In March 2009, Esquire listed Black Joe Lewis and the Honeybears as one of the "Ten Bands Set to Break Out at 2009's SXSW Festival."

History
While working at a pawn shop in Austin, Joe Lewis first picked up the guitar. Shortly thereafter, Joe Lewis immersed himself in the local Red River blues/garage scene, recording and performing with Austin musicians including the Weary Boys and Walter Daniels. Upon the release of the 2005 Brian Salvi produced Black Joe Lewis and The Cold Breeze EP with standout track "Bitch I Love You" featuring Matt Hubbard on Rhodes electric piano and the 2007 album Black Joe Lewis, both released on Italian label Shake Yo Ass Records, the band gained critical national acclaim and toured as openers for Spoon and Okkervil River in 2007.

The band signed to Lost Highway Records in 2008. Following the signing and performances at 2008's Lollapalooza and Austin City Limits Music Festival, Black Joe Lewis & the Honeybears released a four-song EP on January 27, 2009.

Their debut album Tell 'Em What Your Name Is! was released on March 17, 2009. It was produced by Spoon's drummer Jim Eno.

Black Joe Lewis & the Honeybears have performed at music festivals including Bonnaroo, Coachella Valley Music and Arts Festival, Bumbershoot, Outside Lands Music and Arts Festival, Sasquatch! Music Festival, Wakarusa Music and Camping Festival, Musikfest, Latitude Festival, and Splendour in the Grass. The band has appeared on The Late Late Show with Craig Ferguson, Late Show with David Letterman, Austin City Limits, and Later... with Jools Holland.

Black Joe Lewis & the Honeybears were featured in Echotone, a 2010 documentary about the Austin, Texas music scene.

On August 25, 2013, Joe Lewis stated on NPR that he was trying to shed the 'Honeybears' portion of the band's name, and had never intended for it to continue for so long.

In 2017, his album Backlash debuted at number 3 in the Billboard Top Blues Albums Chart.

Discography

Studio albums
 2007 - Black Joe Lewis - Weary Records
 2009 - Tell 'Em What Your Name Is! - Lost Highway Records/Universal Motown
 2011 - Scandalous - Lost Highway Records
 2013 - Electric Slave - Vagrant Records
 2017 - Backlash - INGrooves Music Group
 2018 - The Difference Between Me & You - Black Joe Lewis

EPs
 2005 - Black Joe Lewis and the Cold Breeze - Shake Yo Ass Records
 2009 - Black Joe Lewis - Lost Highway Records

Singles
 2011 - "Boogaloo on Clark Street" - with The Soul Distributors - Papa Bill Records
 2020 - "Five Dollars"

References

External links

Official Black Joe Lewis & the Honey Bears Website
Official Black Joe Lewis MySpace Profile
Official Black Joe Lewis Uvumi Profile with streaming songs
Paste magazine
Spin.com
Stuckbetweenstations.org
Washington Post

Musical groups established in 2007
Musical groups from Austin, Texas
American blues musical groups
American soul musical groups
Lost Highway Records artists
2007 establishments in Texas